Mbouini is a village in the commune of Kani-Kéli on Mayotte. It is located on the southern coast of the island.

Populated places in Mayotte